Resty Nanteza is a Ugandan politician. She is also a radio presenter at NBS radio in Jinja city owned by former member of parliament Hon Igeme Nathan Nabeta. In 2021, she was a candidate to be the woman representative in parliament for the Buikwe district in the 2021 Uganda general elections, after serving as the chairperson of Nyenga Division. She managed to garner 41,561 votes, and was reported as having won in some early lists of results. However, she lost to Diana Mutasingwa (NRM) who won the election with 43,215 votes. Nanteza challenged the results in the courts.

She is a member of the Forum for Democratic Change party.

See also 
 List of members of the eleventh Parliament of Uganda
Forum for Democratic Change
Buikwe District
Member of Parliament
Parliament of Uganda

References

External links 
 Website of the Parliament of Uganda.

21st-century Ugandan women politicians
21st-century Ugandan politicians
Living people
Women members of the Parliament of Uganda
Members of the Parliament of Uganda
Forum for Democratic Change politicians
Year of birth missing (living people)